Kuaiwa was a High Chief of Hawaii from 1345 to 1375.

Kuaiwa was son of Kalaunuiohua and his wife, Kaheka. Kuaiwa followed his father as sovereign of Hawaii. 

Kuaiwa had two wives, Kumuleilani and Kamanawa. The former descended from Luaehu; the latter descended from Maweke of the Nanaulu line. Kamanawa's name means "the season". With Kamuleilani, Kuaiwa had three children, Kahoukapu, Hukulani, and Manauea, and with Kamanawa, Kuaiwa had son, ʻEhu, all of whom became heads of aristocratic families.

References

House of Pili
Hawaiian chiefs